Carolina Wilhelmina van Haren (25 April 1741 - 23 November 1812) was a Dutch noble, the central figure in a famous van Haren incest court case of 1761. The case was a scandal in contemporary Netherlands, where it caused a debate on whether the allegations were accurate or a political conspiracy against her father. It is the subject of research and fiction, a novel and a play.

She was the daughter of the noble and minister Onno Zwier van Haren (1713-1779) and Sara Hüls (1718-1793), and married in 1760 to the lawyer Willem van Hogendorp (1735-1784). In 1760, Carolina Wilhelmina van Haren and her invalid sister Betty privately accused their father of sexual abuse. They were encouraged by her betrothed, because his family refused to consent to the marriage unless her father resigned his post as cabinet minister. In 1761, her father took the matter to court to clear his name, which made the case public and declared himself innocent on the grounds that his daughters were too unattractive for him to molest them. He was acquitted from incest because his daughters refused to testify, but the scandal still forced him to resign.

Carolina Wilhelmina van Haren was disinherited and broke all contact with her family. She often attended the court of the House of Orange and became a known Orangist.  When she separated from her spouse in 1773, she was given an allowance from the House of Orange.

References 
Willemien Schenkeveld, Haren, Carolina Wilhelmina van, in: Digitaal Vrouwenlexicon van Nederland. URL: http://resources.huygens.knaw.nl/vrouwenlexicon/lemmata/data/Haren [13/01/2014]

Incest
18th-century Dutch people
1741 births
1812 deaths